John H. Thompson (born 1951) is an American statistician and former Director of the United States Census Bureau. In this position, one of his main duties was to oversee preparations for the 2020 United States Census. On May 9, 2017, the Commerce Department announced that he would leave his post on June 30.

Biography
Thompson received B.S. and M.S. degrees in mathematics from Virginia Polytechnic Institute and State University in 1973 and 1975, respectively. After graduation, he spent 27 years working at the United States Census Bureau, retiring in 2002 after holding the position of associate director, where he was responsible for the 2000 Census. Prior to that, Thompson served as Chief of the Decennial Management Division. He worked in the Statistical Support Division from 1987 to 1995 and the Statistical Methods Division from 1975 to 1987.

From 2008 to 2013, Thompson was the President and CEO of NORC at the University of Chicago. He was confirmed by the United States Senate to be the 24th Census Bureau director on August 1, 2013.

References

External links
 

1951 births
Living people
American statisticians
Directors of the United States Census Bureau
Obama administration personnel
Virginia Tech alumni
Fellows of the American Statistical Association
Trump administration personnel